is a Japanese manga series written by yipiao and illustrated by Yūjirō Koyama. It has been serialized online via Shueisha's digital publication Shōnen Jump+ since November 2014, and is also serialized in Shueisha's fashion magazine Men's Non-no. It has been collected in eleven tankōbon volumes. A 12-episode anime television series adaptation directed by Akitaro Daichi and animated at Studio Deen aired between April 10 and June 26, 2016.

A live-action film adaptation was originally scheduled to release on June 19, 2020, but was delayed to October 30, 2020 due to the COVID-19 pandemic.

Characters

Played by: Takumi Kitamura

Played by: Brother Tom

Played by: Yusuke Iseya

Played by: Maika Yamamoto

See also 
 Tonkatsu
 Disc jockey

References

External links
 

Anime series based on manga
Comedy anime and manga
Films postponed due to the COVID-19 pandemic
Japanese webcomics
Live-action films based on manga
Manga adapted into films
Shōnen manga
Shueisha franchises
Shueisha manga
Studio Deen
Warner Bros. films
Webcomics in print